La Paz is one of the 18 political and geographic departments of Honduras. The departmental capital is the city of La Paz.

The department covers a total surface area of 2,331 km². In 2015, it had an estimated population of 206,065.

Municipalities
 Aguaqueterique
 Cabañas
 Cane
 Chinacla
 Guajiquiro
 La Paz
 Lauterique
 Marcala
 Mercedes de Oriente
 Opatoro
 San Antonio del Norte
 San José
 San Juan
 San Pedro de Tutule
 Santa Ana
 Santa Elena
 Santa María
 Santiago de Puringla
 Yarula

References

External links
 

 
Departments of Honduras